Nicarete albovittipennis is a species of beetle in the family Cerambycidae. It was described by Breuning in 1957.

Subspecies
 Nicarete albovittipennis albovittipennis Breuning, 1957
 Nicarete albovittipennis nigrotibialis Breuning, 1957

References

Desmiphorini
Beetles described in 1957